Max More (born Max T. O'Connor, January 1964, with name legally changed in 1990) is a philosopher and futurist who writes, speaks, and consults on advanced decision-making about emerging technologies. He is the current Ambassador and President Emeritus (as of February 2021) after serving almost nine and a half years as president and CEO of Alcor Life Extension Foundation.

Born in Bristol, England, More has a degree in Philosophy, Politics and Economics from St Anne's College, Oxford (1987).  His 1995 University of Southern California doctoral dissertation The Diachronic Self: Identity, Continuity, and Transformation examined several issues that concern transhumanists, including the nature of death, and what it is about each individual that continues despite great change over time. In 1996, he married Natasha Vita-More, herself a pioneering transhumanist; the couple are close collaborators on transhumanist and life extension research.

Founder of the Extropy Institute, Max More has written many articles espousing the philosophy of transhumanism and the transhumanist philosophy of extropianism, most importantly his Principles of Extropy. In a 1990 essay "Transhumanism: Toward a Futurist Philosophy", he introduced the term "transhumanism" in its modern sense.

See also
 FM-2030
 Futures studies
 Humanity+

References

External links
 Personal website

1964 births
Alumni of St Anne's College, Oxford
British philosophers
British transhumanists
British libertarians
Extropians
Life extensionists
Living people
University of Southern California alumni
British chief executives
Cryonicists